Józef Karpiel (18 January 1932 – 29 November 1994) was a Polish skier. He competed in the Nordic combined event at the 1960 Winter Olympics.

References

External links
 

1932 births
1994 deaths
Polish male Nordic combined skiers
Olympic Nordic combined skiers of Poland
Nordic combined skiers at the 1960 Winter Olympics
People from Tatra County
20th-century Polish people